Jamshedpur Women's College, established in 1953, is a general degree women's college in the Jharkhand state of India. It was founded by Perin C. Mehta. In 1962 the college acquired its own campus which was gifted by philanthropist Ratan Tata.

It offers undergraduate and postgraduate courses in arts, commerce and sciences. Affiliated with Kolhan University, the university has grade 'A' accreditation from NAAC. It has been recognized by the University Grants Commission as a Center with Potential for Excellence (CPE).

The college aims to provide holistic education for its students while giving special attention to SC and ST students. Under the Jharkhand State University Amendment Act 2017, the college will become the first university for women in Jharkhand. The upgrade was approved by the governor and chancellor of the State Universities, Draupadi Murmu.

Location
The college is located in the town of Jamshedpur in Jharkhand state. Jamshedpur was previously a village called Sakchi which was renamed by Lord Chelmsford in 1919. The city is named Jamshedpur after the founder of Tata Steel, Jamsetji Nusserwanji Tata.

Departments
The college began with an arts department. The science and the commerce departments were added in 1972 and 1974 respectively. Honours courses were also included in various subjects during the 1960s.

The university has added vocational courses such as B.Ed. & M.Ed., Environment and Water Management, Bio technology, Mass Communication and Journalism, Bachelor in Library and Information Science, BBA, MBA, Clinical Nutrition and Dietetics. Additional courses in Electronics, Communicative English, Banking and Human Rights and Value in Education are offered. The college also promotes research by the Gandhian Study Centre for Research.

The UG courses follow a typical six semester trajectory. The dean of Social Sciences is Bina Lakara, Dr Anjali Srivastava for Science and Dr. Deepa Sharan for Commerce.

Science 

Chemistry 
Physics 
Mathematics 
Botany 
Zoology

Arts and Commerce

Bengali
Hindi
English
History
Oriya
Urdu
Sanskrit
Home Science
Political Science
Economics
Philosophy
Psychology
Music
Education
Commerce

Scholarships and stipends 

 (i) Post Matric Scholarship for SC/ST/BC and minority communities etc.
 (ii) Maulana Azad National Scholarship for girl student belonging to minority community.
 (iii) Indira Gandhi Scholarship for single girl child exclusively for PG Students. 
 (iv) Scholarship for minority students.
 The Dr. Anju Priya Akhouri Memorial Scholarship is for the PG topper from the botany department.
 The Dr. Prabhat Kumar Memorial Scholarship is for toppers from intermediate, undergraduate and postgraduate. 
 Students who belongs to SC, ST, OBC or are handicapped, will be recommended to the governments of Bihar/Bengal/Orissa and other states as well.

Facilities

Library 

The Perin Mehta library is automated and provides internet service, which is available to the students at a nominal rate. Books as well as national and international journals are available. The E-Library is associated with the British Council, INFLIBNET and the American Center.

Travel Concessions
Institution rail travel concessions to facilitate travel to their homes or home regions.

Student Welfare Services
A variety of social services are available to support the students.
 Placement Cell. Provides employment placement, which has included multinational companies
 Grievance Redressal Cell
 Women's Cell
 Counselling Cell
 Cultural Cell
 Freeship Committee
 SC/ST Committee
 Internal Quality Assurance Cell
 Anti-ragging Cell as per U.G.C. Notification
 Cultural Society
 Sports Committee
 Legal Aid Clinic

Hostel
The hostel is affiliated with Youth Hostel Association of India. The organisation organizes treks and adventures at a local as well as national level. There are two hostels featuring TV, Internet, Newspaper, Magazine, Telephones and Indoor games, both on campus. The Mahadevi Verma hostel can accommodate 50 students. The CV Raman hostel can house 100 students.

Sports and NCC
Sport facilities on the campus include cricket, volleyball, archery, basketball, khokho, kabaddi, karate and indoor games. There are scholarships provided by the Sports Authority of India. Students can also join the NCC.

Special Features 
 On site daycare center, serving both students and staff
 Audio-Visual Room 
 Communicative English classes are conducted for the UG student during the in the college three academic years.
 Water cooler facility
 Common room for girls - Under Construction
 Student feedback system
 Placement cell and counseling center
 Internet Facility in the Computer Center & in all Departments
 Education Loans provided to needy & BPL Students upon presentation of Income Certificate.

Notable alumni 
 Arati Bhattacharya
 G. S. Lakshmi

See also
Education in India
Literacy in India
List of institutions of higher education in Jharkhand

References

External links
 http://www.jsrwomenscollege.ac.in/

Colleges affiliated to Kolhan University
Educational institutions established in 1953
Universities and colleges in Jharkhand
Education in Jamshedpur
1953 establishments in Bihar